Diplacus rupicola, the Death Valley monkeyflower, is a flowering plant in the family Phrymaceae.

Distribution
Diplacus rupicola is endemic to the northern Mojave Desert within Inyo County, in eastern California.

Although quite rare, the Death Valley monkeyflower  can be found in shaded limestone crevices on steep canyon walls in the mountains bordering Death Valley, and the sky islands in the northern Mojave Desert.

Description
Diplacus rupicola is a perennial herbaceous plant, growing 1–17 cm tall, with oblanceolate leaves 2–6 cm long. It has pinkish flowers, often faint in color, and has a magenta-purple spot on each lobe.

References

Mojave Desert Wildflowers, Jon Mark Stewart, 1998, pg. 162

External links
Jepson Flora Project - Mimulus rupicola (Death Valley monkeyflower)
USDA Plants Profile: Mimulus rupicola
UC CalPhotos gallery of Mimulus rupicola (Death Valley monkeyflower)

rupicola
Endemic flora of California
Flora of the California desert regions
Death Valley National Park
Natural history of the Mojave Desert
Natural history of Inyo County, California
Panamint Range
Flora without expected TNC conservation status